Port-en-Bessin-Huppain is a commune in the Calvados department in the Normandy region in northwestern France.

The commune contains the two towns of Port-en-Bessin and Huppain.

Population

History
The name Huppain stems from Norse/Norwegian Oppheim, reflecting the general Viking history of Normandy.

The town was captured by Royal Marines of No. 47 (Royal Marine) Commando in Operation Aubery during the Normandy landings and used as the terminal for PLUTO (Pipe-Lines Under The Ocean).

Media

Port-en-Bessin was used to represent nearby Ouistreham in the 1962 film The Longest Day.

Sister cities
  Saint-Pierre, Saint Pierre and Miquelon, (France), since 1976.

See also
Communes of the Calvados department

Gallery

References

Communes of Calvados (department)
Calvados communes articles needing translation from French Wikipedia
Populated coastal places in France